The Proud and the Beautiful (sub-title: Alvarado, aka The Proud Ones) is a 1953 drama film directed by Yves Allégret. It was nominated for the Academy Award for Best Story (the nomination officially went to Jean-Paul Sartre), but lost to Dalton Trumbo (under the pseudonym Robert Rich) for The Brave One.

Cast
Michèle Morgan as Nellie, a beautiful French tourist, whose husband suddenly dies, leaving her without resource in a foreign squalid village.
Gérard Philipe as Georges, a castaway drunkard, bubble of the local mob, formerly French M.D.
Carlos López Moctezuma as "el doctor", the local worn-out M.D.
Víctor Manuel Mendoza as Don Rodrigo, the local god-father, a typical bullying macho.
Michèle Cordoue as Anna, Don Rodrigo's harsh and vulgar French wife.
André Toffel as Tom, a French tourist stopping to die of meningitis in Alvarado
Arturo Soto Rangel as the local priest.
Luis Buñuel as one of Don Rodrigo's gun-bearers. The realistic-satirical description of the plague, along with numerous local spicy private jokes in the abundant Spanish part of the dialogue certainly owes a lot to the guest-star's presence.

References

External links
 
 
 Les Orgueilleux at Dvdrama
 Les Orgueilleux at Films de France
 

1953 films
1953 drama films
French drama films
Mexican drama films
1950s French-language films
1950s Spanish-language films
Films about infectious diseases
Films about alcoholism
Films set in Mexico
Films directed by Yves Allégret
Films produced by Raymond Borderie
Films with screenplays by Jean Aurenche
French black-and-white films
Mexican black-and-white films
1950s French films
1950s Mexican films